Illinois Route 33 (IL 33) is a multidirectional highway in southeastern Illinois, with its western terminus at Illinois Route 128 on the Fayette–Effingham county line near Beecher City and its southern terminus at U.S. Route 50 east of Lawrenceville. It also overlaps Illinois Route 32 from Shumway to Effingham.

Route description 

Illinois 33 is a largely rural state highway. It runs east from near Beecher City to meet Illinois Route 32 in Shumway. Through Effingham it is Fayette Avenue and Willow Street. Continuing to the southeast, it runs through the small towns of Dieterich and Wheeler. It then travel through Newton and joins with Illinois Route 130 and goes north.  Two miles north of Newton it branches off and travels east through Oblong and then to Robinson.  In Palestine, the road runs along Washington and Franklin Streets before turning south on Jackson Street and leaving the city.

Illinois 33 continues south, parallel to the Wabash River and beneath U.S. Route 50. There is no intersection at this point. Illinois 33 then travels west (along the old alignment of U.S. 50) and then back north to meet its terminus at a full interchange with U.S. 50.

History 
SBI Route 33 originally was Effingham to Gordon (near Robinson). In 1937, 1941 and 1948, extensions were made east to Palestine, west to Beecher City, and then south to U.S. 50 to complete the route.

Major intersections

References

External links

 Illinois Highway Ends: Illinois Route 33

033
Transportation in Effingham County, Illinois
Transportation in Jasper County, Illinois
Transportation in Crawford County, Illinois
Transportation in Lawrence County, Illinois